Vere Poulett, 3rd Earl Poulett (18 May 1710 – 14 April 1788), styled The Honourable Vere Poulett until 1764, was an English peer.

Poulett was the son of John Poulett, 1st Earl Poulett, and Bridget Bertie, daughter of Peregrine Bertie. He was the brother of John Poulett, 2nd Earl Poulett, Peregrine Poulett and Anne Poulett,  and was educated at Taunton Grammar School. He was returned to parliament for Bridgwater in 1741, a seat he held until 1747. He succeeded his elder brother in the earldom in 1764. In 1771 he was appointed Lord Lieutenant of Devon, which he remained until his death.

Lord Poulett married Mary Butt, daughter of Richard Butt, of Arlington, Gloucestershire. Their younger son the Honourable Vere Poulett was a soldier and politician. Lord Poulett died in April 1788, aged 77, and was succeeded in the earldom by his elder son, John. The Countess Poulett died in April 1819.

References

1710 births
1788 deaths
Poulett, Vere
Lord-Lieutenants of Devon
Poulett, Vere
People educated at Taunton Grammar School
3
Burials at the Poulett mausoleum, Church of St George (Hinton St George)
Vere, 3rd Earl